Kenneth Paul Zebrowski (born November 20, 1980) is a Democratic member of the New York State Assembly, from the 96th district, representing the communities of Clarkstown and Haverstraw, and portions of the Town of Ramapo, including the villages of Pomona, Wesley Hills, and most of New Hempstead. Prior to his election to the Assembly he served in the Rockland County Legislature.

Governmental career 
During his years of service in the State Assembly, Zebrowski has authored and passed numerous bills that affect the lives of New Yorkers. In 2013, Ken authored and passed a Hepatitis C testing bill that was the first of its kind in the nation. This bill, which has served as a template for numerous other States, has led to the testing of thousands of New Yorkers enabling them to get treatment for this life-threatening disease. Ken has been a leader in the Assembly majority, working with coalitions of like-minded legislators to achieve real results for New York families. Over the past several budget cycles, Ken was successful in capping the Medicaid costs of County governments, preventing reductions and changes to the STAR property tax relief program, restoring the GEA cuts to schools and protecting Rockland businesses from losing tax incentives. Assemblyman Zebrowski was the author of the full day kindergarten funding bill that achieved full day K for North Rockland and puts a full day K program in reach for the entire state.

Ken has been a reform minded legislator who has sponsored bills to clean up government and fight corruption. In 2018 he was the sponsor of a bill that passed in the State budget to bring transparency to previously unregulated “dark money” internet ads. He also authored and got passed a bill to establish the new crime of criminal sexual coercion to protect New Yorkers from inappropriate retaliation and abuse. In 2019, he authored a law that requires all campaign material to include “paid for by” disclosures and sponsored a law that prevents LLC’s that own real estate from hiding the identity of their members.

While working on significant statewide legislation, Zebrowski has also been a strong advocate for Rockland County and its unique issues. There is no stronger voice against irresponsible development and illegal housing. Zebrowski’s dogged advocacy has exposed illegal building and fire code practices throughout the County that puts people’s lives and home values at risk. His efforts have overhauled the school inspection process; implementing both regulatory reforms and legislative changes that ensures school buildings are inspected and administrators are held accountable. Ken achieved a toll freeze/discount for Rockland commuters over the new Tappan Zee/Mario M. Cuomo Bridge and has aggressively fought for investments by the MTA and NJ Transit who too often ignore West of Hudson commuters. Ken co-authored the bill that set up a deficit financing program, with annual Comptroller review, to help Rockland County get out of a $96 million deficit and established oversight and additional funds for the East Ramapo School District. He has also authored and passed bills for Rockland County school districts and taxpayers that have dealt with unique tax certiorari challenges and tax shifts. Some additional examples of his efforts to improve Rockland’s economy and foster job creation include: adding Rockland to a manufacturing tax incentive program, reforming regulations in the craft beer industry to foster Rockland’s growing brewers and opposing the MTA payroll tax. Assemblyman Zebrowski has been successful in securing significant funding for Rockland County municipalities and not for profit agencies. This funding has fixed Rockland’s infrastructure, assisted the developmentally disabled, fostered inclusion and diversity, protected the environment, increased recreational and cultural opportunities, preserved our history and promoted public safety.

Zebrowski was appointed as the Chairman of the Committee on Governmental Operations in January 2020. As Chair, Ken helps guide the Assembly in the areas of governmental reform, lobbying laws, crime victims, human rights, the executive law, the rights of the physically challenged, state procurement, the Freedom of Information and Open Meetings Laws, public lands and buildings, and the organization and operation of the executive and legislative branches of State government. He previously served as the Chairman of the Committee on Banks where he led the charge to protect consumers, passed legislation to regulate the student loan industry, worked to foster community and state chartered banks, and dealt with the changing legal structure surrounding emerging financial products and the Fintech industry.

In addition to Chairing the Banks and Governmental Operations Committees, Ken has spent over a decade on the Judiciary and Codes Committees working on issues related to criminal justice, domestic violence and all matters affecting our Court system. He has served, or currently serves, on several other Committees in the State Assembly including: Rules, Environmental Conservation, Labor, Government Employees, Ethics and Libraries.

Education and law career
Zebrowski graduated from Clarkstown Schools before receiving his Bachelor of Arts degree (Magna cum laude) in political science from the State University of New York at Albany and his Juris Doctor degree from the Seton Hall University School of Law.

Upon his graduation from law school, Zebrowski founded the firm of Zebrowski & Zebrowski with his father, the late Assemblyman Kenneth Peter Zebrowski. Currently he is "of counsel" to the firm Braunfotel & Frendel in New City, New York.

Political career

In 2005, Zebrowski served in the Rockland County Legislature.

On May 1, 2007, he won a special election to fill the State Assembly seat of his late father. He ran uncontested in the 2008 general election and won the 2010 general election with 58 percent of the vote. He was re-elected in 2012, 2014, 2016, 2018, and 2020.

In 2019, Zebrowski ran for Rockland County District Attorney. He finished in second-place in the Democratic Primary with 25% of the vote, behind former state Supreme Court judge Thomas Walsh, who won 52% of the vote.

Personal life
Assemblyman Zebrowski lives in the Town of Clarkstown with his wife Clare, a Certified Registered Nurse Anesthetist, daughter Reagan and son Kenneth Patrick.

Prior to his election to the State Assembly, Zebrowski was a member of the Rockland County Legislature for one year. Ken was active in the Rockland County community; volunteering for several not-for-profit organizations and also serving as a youth sports coach.

Election results
 May 2007 special election, NYS Assembly, 94th AD
{| class="Wikitable"
| Kenneth P. Zebrowski (DEM - IND - CON - WOR) || ... || 3,913
|-
| Matthew Brennan (REP) || ... || 1,268
|}

 November 2008 general election, NYS Assembly, 94th AD
{| class="Wikitable"
| Kenneth P. Zebrowski (DEM - IND - CON - WOR) || ... || 43,227
|}

 November 2010 general election, NYS Assembly, 94th AD
{| class="Wikitable"
| Kenneth P. Zebrowski (DEM - IND) || ... || 22,645
|-
| Frank P. Sparaco (REP - CON - WOR) || ... || 16,750
|}

 November 2012 general election, NYS Assembly, 99th AD
{| class="Wikitable"
| Kenneth P. Zebrowski (DEM - IND) || ... || 41,526
|}

 November 2014 general election, NYS Assembly, 99th AD
{| class="Wikitable"
| Kenneth P. Zebrowski (DEM - IND) || ... || 20,534
|-
| Matthew I. Brennan	 (REP) || ... || 11,026
|}

References

External links
New York State Assembly Member Website

1980 births
Living people
American politicians of Polish descent
Democratic Party members of the New York State Assembly
Politicians from Rockland County, New York
University at Albany, SUNY alumni
Seton Hall University School of Law alumni
People from Suffern, New York
21st-century American politicians